The Uruguay River is a major river in South America. It flows from north to south and forms parts of the boundaries of Brazil, Argentina, and Uruguay, separating some of the Argentine provinces of La Mesopotamia from the other two countries. It passes between the states of Santa Catarina and Rio Grande do Sul in Brazil; forms the eastern border of the provinces of Misiones, Corrientes, and Entre Ríos in Argentina; and makes up the western borders of the departments of Artigas, Salto, Paysandú, Río Negro, Soriano, and Colonia in Uruguay.

Course

In this stage the river goes through uneven, broken terrain, forming rapids and falls. Its course through Rio Grande do Sul is not navigable

An unusual feature of the Uruguay River is a submerged canyon. This canyon formed during the Ice Age, when the climate was drier and the river was narrower. The canyon is only visible in two places, one of which is the Moconá Falls (also called the Yucumã Falls). However, the falls are not visible for 150 days per year and become more like rapids when they are not visible. Unlike most waterfalls, the Moconá Falls are parallel to the river, not perpendicular. The  Turvo State Park, created in 1947, protects the Brazilian side of the falls.

Together with the Paraná River, the Uruguay forms the Río de la Plata estuary. It is navigable from around Salto Chico. Its main tributary is the Río Negro, which is born in the south of Brazil and goes through Uruguay for 500 km until its confluence with the Uruguay River, which is located 100 km north of the Uruguay's confluence with the Río de la Plata, in Punta Gorda, Colonia Department, Uruguay.

The river is crossed by five international bridges called (from north to south): Integration Bridge and Paso de los Libres-Uruguaiana International Bridge, between Argentina and Brazil; and the Salto Grande Bridge, General Artigas Bridge and Libertador General San Martín Bridge between Argentina and Uruguay.

Its main economic use is the generation of hydroelectricity and it is dammed in its lower portion by the Salto Grande Dam and by the Itá Dam upstream in Brazil.

Origin of the name
The name of the river tends to comes from the Spanish settlers' interpretation of the Guaraní language word the inhabitants of the region used to designate it. There are several interpretations, including "the river of the uru (an indigenous bird)", and "[river of] the uruguá" (an indigenous gastropod, Pomella megastoma).

Cellulose plant conflict

Argentina and Uruguay experienced a conflict over the construction of pulp mills on the Uruguay River. Two European companies, ENCE and Botnia, proposed building cellulose processing plants at Fray Bentos, Uruguay, opposite Gualeguaychú, Argentina. According to a 1975 treaty, Argentina and Uruguay were supposed to jointly agree on matters relating to the Uruguay River. Argentina alleged that Uruguay broke the treaty. Additionally, Argentina believed the Finnish company Botnia was polluting the fish and the overall environment of the river while Uruguay believed that the plant was not depositing a large amount of toxins in the Uruguay River.

Starting in April 2005, residents of Gualeguaychú, as well as many others, protested, claiming that the plants would pollute the river shared by the two countries. Beginning in December 2005, the international bridges linking the Argentine province of Entre Ríos with Uruguay were intermittently blockaded by Argentine protesters, causing major disruptions in commercial traffic and tourism.

In 2006, Argentina brought the dispute before the International Court of Justice. The ICJ completed hearings between Argentina and Uruguay regarding the dispute on October 2, 2009. In 2010, the court ruled that although Uruguay failed to inform Argentina of the construction of the pulp mills, the mills did not pollute the river, so closing the remaining pulp mill would be unjustified. Later in 2010, Argentina and Uruguay created a joint commission to coordinate activities on the river.

Links across the Uruguay
The course of the Uruguay is crossed by the following bridges, beginning upstream:

See also

 List of rivers of the Americas
 Geography of Uruguay
 Tributaries of the Río de la Plata

References

External links

  Salto Grande Hydroelectric System
 
 
 
 "Map of the Uruguay River from Yapeyu to the Farm of Sn. Gregorio" from 1784

 
Rivers of Santa Catarina (state)
Rivers of Rio Grande do Sul
Rivers of Uruguay
Rivers of Argentina
Argentina–Brazil border
Argentina–Uruguay border
International rivers of South America
Border rivers
Rivers of Misiones Province
Rivers of Entre Ríos Province
Rivers of Corrientes Province